Freedom flag may refer to:

 The Freedom of Speech flag documenting the AACS encryption key controversy.
 Any number of national or institution flags, including:
 The Flag of the United States
 The Flag of South Vietnam
 The French Tricolore
 The LGBT movement Rainbow flag
 The Four Freedoms Flag of the United Nations.

See also